Gustav Botz (4 August 1883 – 29 September 1932) was a German actor.

Early Life and Career 
Botz was born on 4 August 1883 at Bremen, German Empire

Botz began his career in film business The Foreign Prince (1918), The Devil (1918), His Majesty the Hypochondriac (1918), Ikarus, the Flying Man (1918), The Rose of Stamboul (1919), The Secret of the American Docks (1919), The Head of Janus (1920), Monika Vogelsang (1920), Battle of the Sexes (1920) Mary Magdalene (1920), Catherine the Great (1920), The Courier from Lisbon (1921), Peter Voss, Their of Millions (1921), The Eternal Struggle (1921), Lola Montez, the King's Dancer (1922), Dr. Mabuse the Gambler (1922), Nosferatu (1922) His last film role was in 1924's My Leopold and Botz retired from the film business

Personal Life and death 
On the 29 September 1932, After suffering unknown disease, Botz died at Bremen, Weimar Republic at the age 49. His death certificate named the cause of death as "Physically induced brain injury". His was body cremated and his ashes were given to his family

Selected filmography
 The Foreign Prince (1918)
 The Devil (1918)
 His Majesty the Hypochondriac (1918)
 Ikarus, the Flying Man (1918)
 The Rose of Stamboul (1919)
 The Secret of the American Docks (1919)
 The Head of Janus (1920)
 Monika Vogelsang (1920)
 Battle of the Sexes (1920)
 Mary Magdalene (1920)
 Catherine the Great (1920)
 The Courier from Lisbon (1921)
 Peter Voss, Thief of Millions (1921)
 The Eternal Struggle (1921)
 Lola Montez, the King's Dancer (1922)
 Dr. Mabuse the Gambler (1922)
 Nosferatu (1922)
 My Leopold (1924)

Bibliography
 Eisner, Lotte H. The Haunted Screen: Expressionism in the German Cinema and the Influence of Max Reinhardt. University of California Press, 2008.

External links

1883 births
1932 deaths
German male film actors
German male silent film actors
Actors from Bremen
20th-century German male actors